Cladonia albonigra (Bokmål: Svartfotbeger, Swedish: Svartvit bägarlav) is a species of fruticose lichen in the family Cladoniaceae. It can be found as far south as Canada and the United States, and as far north as the Arctic Circle. It prefers acidic soils, and is known to host on trees of the genus Thuja.

References

albonigra
Lichen species
Lichens of Europe
Lichens of North America
Lichens described in 1996
Taxa named by Irwin Brodo
Lichens of the Arctic